John Counsell may refer to:
 John Counsell (theatre director) (1905–1987), English actor, director and theatre manager
 John Counsell (pastor), Canadian pastor and broadcaster